Rotary joint may refer to:

 Coupling, a mechanical device used to connect two shafts together at their ends for the purpose of transmitting power, including flexible couplings
 Rotary union, a coupling for passing fluid through a rotating joint
 Pivot joint, between animal bones
 Slip ring assembly, used to send electrical power and signals across a rotating connection
 Waveguide rotary joint, used to send microwave power and signals across a rotating connection
 Integrated Truss Structure#Solar alpha rotary joint, in the International Space Station